NGC 4631 (also known as the Whale Galaxy or Caldwell 32) is a  barred spiral galaxy in the constellation Canes Venatici.  This galaxy's slightly distorted wedge shape gives it the appearance of a herring or a whale, hence its nickname.  Because this nearby galaxy is seen edge-on from Earth, professional astronomers observe this galaxy to better understand the gas and stars located outside the plane of the galaxy.

Starburst and superwind 

NGC 4631 contains a central starburst, which is a region of intense star formation.  The strong star formation is evident in the emission from ionized hydrogen and interstellar dust heated by the stars formed in the starburst.  The most massive stars that form in star formation regions only burn hydrogen gas through fusion for a short period of time, after which they explode as supernovae.  So many supernovae have exploded in the center of NGC 4631 that they are blowing gas out of the plane of the galaxy. This superwind can be seen in X-rays and in spectral line emission.  The gas from this superwind has produced a giant, diffuse corona of hot, X-ray emitting gas around the whole galaxy.

Nearby galaxies and galaxy group 
NGC 4631 has a nearby companion dwarf elliptical galaxy, NGC 4627.  NGC 4627 and NGC 4631 together were listed in the Atlas of Peculiar Galaxies as an example of a "double galaxy" or a galaxy pair.

NGC 4631 and NGC 4627 are part of the NGC 4631 Group, a group of galaxies that also includes the interacting galaxies NGC 4656 and NGC 4657.  However, exact group identification is problematic because this galaxy and others lie in a part of the sky that is relatively crowded.  Estimates of the number of galaxies in this group range from 5 to 27, and all studies identify very different member galaxies for this group.

See also 
NGC 891, a similar edge-on spiral galaxy
NGC 4565, a similar edge-on spiral galaxy
NGC 5907, a similar edge-on spiral galaxy

References

External links 

APOD (2004-01-23) – The Whale Galaxy
APOD (2010-05-17) – The Whale Galaxy (a better image)

 SEDS – NGC 4631

Barred spiral galaxies
NGC 4631 Group
Canes Venatici
4631
07865
42637
281
032b